A hybrid heat system reacts to changes in temperature and automatically adjusts to the most efficient energy saving method available to heat or cool a house. It can be a fuel-saving alternative to traditional heating and cooling systems in which it combines a furnace with a heat pump, rather than an air conditioner.

Mechanics 
A heat pump works as an air conditioner in hot weather, but can also reverse the process and heat the home when cold weather arrives. Rather than burning fuel to generate heat, the heat pump moves heat via the transmission of R-410A refrigerant without burning a flame, using a small amount of energy to move heat from one location to another.

Hybrid heat can work with both gas and electric systems. By using a variable speed fan, hot or cool air gets distributed consistently and evenly throughout a space. Variable speed fans use direct-current electronically commutated (ECM) motors.

Energy consumption 
While local energy costs vary, a heat pump can reduce electricity use by up to 40 percent. A local utility provider or a heating & cooling contractor can provide energy savings analysis via a home energy audit.

References

Heating, ventilation, and air conditioning
Cooling technology
Heat pumps